Zadok was a high priest of the Israelites in Jerusalem during the reigns of David and Solomon.

Zadok may also refer to:

People 
 The founder of the Sadducees, the priestly sect during the time of the Second Temple
 Zadok, the father of Jerusha, who was the mother of King Jotham of Judah
 Zadok, a Pharisee and co-founder of the Zealots
 Zadok, son of Azor, appearing in the Genealogy of Jesus
 Zadok II, grandson of Azariah
 Erez Zadok is the current maintainer of the Berkeley Automounter
 Charles Zadok (1897-1984), American businessman, art collector and patron
 Haim Yosef Zadok (1913-2002), Israeli jurist and politician
 Rabbi Zadok, tanna of the 1st-century CE
 Rachel Zadok, South-African writer currently based in London, England
 Yehuda Zadok (born 1958), Israeli Olympic runner

Arts, entertainment, and media

Fictional entities
Zadok Allen, a character in the H. P. Lovecraft novella The Shadow over Innsmouth

Music
Zadok the Priest, an 18th-century coronation anthem by Handel

Companies
Zadok, a manufacturer of music soft and hardware (Zadok Audio & Media Products), see the List of synthesizer manufacturers
 Haim Zadok & Co., a Tel Aviv law firm

See also 
 Zadoc (given name) for a list of people with this name and other variants 

Hebrew masculine given names
Hebrew-language surnames